A lyceum is a category of school in the education system of many countries.

Lyceum may also refer to:
 Lyceum (classical), a gymnasium in Athens, location of Aristotle's peripatetic school

History 
 Oregon Lyceum, 1840s Pioneer political forum
 Lyceum movement, United States trend in architecture

Technology 
 Lyceum (software), blogging platform
 Lyceum (synchronous CMC software)
 Lyceum TV, 1980s RCA Dimensia and Colortrak 2000

Sport 
 Pittsburgh Lyceum, ice hockey team, 1907–1920
 Pittsburgh Lyceum (American football) 1906–1910

Other uses 
 Lyceum (album), 1989 by The Orchids
 Mount Lyceum, Arcadia, Greece
 Lyceum Club (Australia), a women's group

Places and specific schools 
Excluding the many lyceums in countries where the term is a standard description in the education system:

in Brazil 
 Lyceum of Arts and Crafts of São Paulo, Brazil

in India 
 Trinity Lyceum School, Kollam, India

in Lithuania 
 Vilnius Lyceum, Lithuania

in Pakistan 
 The Lyceum School, Karachi, Pakistan

in the Philippines
 Lyceum-Northwestern University, Dagupan City, Philippines
 Lyceum of the Philippines University (Manila)
 Lyceum of the Philippines University–Batangas (Batangas City)
 Lyceum of the Philippines University–Cavite (General Trias)
 Lyceum of the Philippines University-Laguna (Calamba City)

in Poland 
 liceum ogólnokształcące, polish equivalent of high school

in South Africa 
 Lyceum College, South Africa

in Spain 
 Liceu, opera house in Barcelona

in Sri Lanka 
 Lyceum International School, Sri Lanka

in Sweden 
 Stockholms Lyceum, Sweden

in Turkey 
 Zografeion Lyceum, Istanbul, Turkey; Greek school

in the United Kingdom 
 Lyceum, Port Sunlight, Merseyside, UK
 The Lyceum, Liverpool, UK
 Lyceum Theatre, London, UK
 Lyceum Theatre (Sheffield), UK
 Royal Lyceum Theatre, Edinburgh, UK

in the United States 
(by state then city)
 Lyceum Hall, Lewiston, Maine, listed on the National Register of Historic Places (NRHP) in Maine
 Lyceum-The Circle Historic District, Oxford, Mississippi, listed on the NRHP in Mississippi
 Lyceum Theater (Clovis, New Mexico), Clovis, New Mexico, listed on the NRHP in Curry County, New Mexico
 Bronx Lyceum, New York City, USA
 The Lyceum Academy, Wilmington, North Carolina
 Lyceum, Oklahoma, defunct academic community (1896–1925)
 Lyceum Village Square and German Wallace College, Berea, Ohio (listed on the NRHP in Cuyahoga County, Ohio)
 Jenkins' Town Lyceum Building, Jenkintown, Pennsylvania (listed on the NRHP in Montgomery County, Pennsylvania)
 Lyceum (Alexandria, Virginia), listed on the NRHP in Virginia

See also 
 Lyceum Theatre (disambiguation)
 Lycée (disambiguation)
 Lise (disambiguation)